Dario Cecchini (born 1955) is a leading contemporary internationally known Italian butcher from Panzano in the Chianti region of Italy. Dario has appeared on shows like Chef's Table, in which he brings a fun and playful attitude to his restaurants.

Biography
Cecchini was born in 1955 in the Tuscan village of Panzano where his father was a butcher. He studied veterinary science at a university at Pisa but left half-way through his studies in 1976 to take over the family business from his dying father.
Described as "... a personality, a celebrity, and a butcher extraordinaire. A theatrical host, a show-stopper, and an artist",

In March 2014, Cecchini was featured in BBC Radio 4's The Food Programme, which included a recording of him presenting at the MAD Symposium in August 2013 in Copenhagen, to 500 chefs from around the world. As if the 20 minutes Cecchini spent describing his life’s work and his love for his wife weren’t poetic enough, he closed by reciting a lengthy passage from Dante Alighieri, by heart.

Cecchini, on a mission to protect and promote the traditional local butcher from the rise of the powerful supermarkets, explained that he believed butchery was an ancient art that involved a respect for the animal, seeing his role as that of teacher and educator. According to Cecchini, there were no "premium" and "lower" cuts of meat, but rather all the parts of the animal were useful if butchered and cooked in an appropriate way. Cecchini argues that his work could amount to poetry, a combination of knowledge (understanding that you can use every part of the animal) and consciousness (respect for the animal) that can bring people back to the “original customs of the tribe,“ in a world where everything seems to be getting more and more commodified, processed and impersonal.

In 2007, Cecchini was featured in Season 3, Episode 15 of Anthony Bourdain: No Reservations.

In 2019, Dario Cecchini was featured in Netflix' documentary series Chef's Table.

In media 
 Dario Cecchini presentation at the MAD3: "Carne e Spirito"  in August 2013.

 Anthony Bourdain: No Reservations - Season 3, Episode 15

References

Meat industry
1955 births
Living people